Elizabeth Anne Gard'ner (24 December 1858 – 5 June 1926) was a Swedish-born New Zealand home science teacher, administrator, and writer. 

Elizabeth Anne Milne was born in Allerum, Sweden. She is regarded as the pioneer of home science education in New Zealand.

References

External links
 Elizabeth Anne Gard'ner at Christchurch City Libraries

1858 births
1926 deaths
19th-century New Zealand writers
19th-century New Zealand women writers
19th-century New Zealand educators
Swedish emigrants to New Zealand
People from Helsingborg Municipality
Home economists